Minnesota North College – Vermilion (VCC), previously known as Vermilion Community College (VCC), is a public community college campus located in Ely, Minnesota, adjacent to the Boundary Waters Canoe Area Wilderness and the Superior National Forest. It several niche programs focusing on natural resources, natural sciences, and outdoor education. The campus offers residential housing to nearly half of all attending students. In 2022, the board of trustees of the Minnesota State Colleges and Universities merged the college with several others into a single institution called Minnesota North College.

Campus

The campus sits on over 80 acres of property located on the outskirts of Ely, and runs an off-site Outdoor Learning Center for student use. This center has cabins, a classroom, forest area, a beach with docks, and is located on Fall Lake which is as an entry point into the Boundary Waters Canoe Area Wilderness (BWCAW).

In March 2022, the board of trustees of the Minnesota State Colleges and Universities system approved merger of the college with Hibbing Community College, Itasca Community College, Mesabi Range College and Rainy River Community College into a single institution called Minnesota North College.

Academics 
Academic programs range from Law Enforcement to Natural Resources to Animal Sciences to Outdoor Recreation to Business to Liberal Arts.

Law enforcement program 
The Law Enforcement program offers a 19 credit certification program called Seasonal Park Law Enforcement Ranger Training with an optional park ranger academy at the end.

Art program 
In 2015, a kiln shelter was built on the campus for wood and soda firing of ceramics, as well as an area for a foundry.

The art department offers traditional art courses that include Drawing, Ceramics, and Painting from Environmental Design, Wilderness Digital Photography, and Introduction to Video and the Moving Image.

Vet Tech Program 
In the fall of 2017, a new Vet Tech Program was launched. The program involves 75 credit hours.

Housing 
In August 2017, the campus unveiled a new $6 Million 120 bed townhouse style housing that covers 26,000 square-feet. Vermilion Community College accommodates over 60% of its students in its housing.

References

External links
 

Two-year colleges in the United States
Universities and colleges in St. Louis County, Minnesota
Educational institutions established in 1922
Community colleges in Minnesota
Minnesota North College
Buildings and structures in Ely, Minnesota
NJCAA athletics
1922 establishments in Minnesota